Communications in the Solomon Islands.

Telephones 

Landline

 2009: 13,000 subscribers
 2010:  8,400 subscribers
 2018: 7,430 subscribers

Mobile cellular:

 2009: 55,000 subscribers, 20% penetration, 20%coverage
 2018: 482,209 subscribers, 80% penetration, 95% coverage  

Telecom operators: 

 Our Telekom (1988). Operates in nine Provinces
 bmobile  (2010). Operates in four Provinces

Telephone system:
GSM mobile phone network covering all provincial capitals along with several other townships and villages and a landline system covering all provincial capitals and some townships.

International dial code:+677

 Landline number: 5-digits
 Mobile number: 7-digits 
 Telekom: 7xx xxxx 
 bmobile: 8xx xxxx

Connectivity 
International

 Satellite: Leased geostationary and constellation Ka, Ku band satellites
 Undersea fibre: In January 2020, Solomon Islands was connected to Sydney, Australia via the Coral Seas Cable System (CS2)
 
 Earth stations: based in Honiara and Gizo

Domestic

 Satellite: Leased, bi-directional geostationary satellites are used to connect Provinces too remote for microwave and fibre
 Undersea fibre: Interchange Cable Network 2 (ICN2S) In February 2020 as part of the Coral Seas Cable System project, Honiara (Guadalcanal Province) was also connected to Auki (Mataita Province), Taro (Choiseul Province) and Noro (Western Province)
 DSL, ADSL: To homes and businesses
 Fixed Wireless: Honiara
 Mobile: 2G/3G/4GLTE

Radio 
Radio broadcast stations:
AM 1, FM 4 Paoa FM, ZFM100, Wan FM, and Barava FM, shortwave 1 (2002).  The Solomon Islands Broadcasting Corporation, founded in 1976, transmits regular programming.

Radio
Receivers: 57,000 (1997)
In addition to regular broadcast stations, several shortwave utility station networks exist, such as the Church of Melanesia network.

Television 
TTV is Solomon Islands only television network and is a wholly owned subsidiary of Solomon Telekom Co. Ltd. (STCL). STCL operates under the brand name - Our Telekom.

TTV transmits in digital HD and analogue and is a free-to-air, commercial, terrestrial television network, located in the capital, Honiara. 

History:
The first television broadcast was made possible in July 1992 by STCL who downlinked the Barcelona Summer Olympics utilising the satellite antennas used to relay international telephone calls and a small TV transmitter as an experiment.

2006: ONE News leased the STCL owned transmitters to broadcast a local channel until 2011 when it went out of business.   

2008 (March): Telekom Television Ltd was formed 

2016: HD services launched (FTA DVB-T). Commenced broadcasting National Parliament live to air on TTV ONE. 

2019: Broadcast three analogue SD and sixteen 1080i/50 HD digital (DVB-T) channels in the VHF/UHF frequency bands. The HD channels, available in Honiara, are a mixture of overseas sport, news and entertainments channels. Two of the TTV branded analogue SD channels (TTV 1, TTV 2) are distributed to five major locations in the Solomons: Gizo, Noro, Munda, Auki and Lata. Distribution is via satellite and microwave links.

Standards:
TTV conforms to the Australian television frequencies for both analogue and digital transmissions and production (1080i/50).

Channels:
TTV branded channels include: TTV ONE, TTV TWO and TTV THREE. TTV ONE is the main commercial channel and carries a mixture of local and international sport, news and entertainment programming. 

Online:
TTV is also streamed Online (as programme rights allow) and is accessible via the Our Telekom mobile network throughout the Solomons. The service is Geoblocked to the Solomons.

Televisions:
3,000 (1997). Estimated viewership: 35,000 (2017)

Internet 
Internet Service Providers (ISPs):Solomon Telekom: https://telekom.com.sb/ McPacific: http://www.mc-pacific.com/satellite.htmlSATSOL: https://satsol.net/

People First Network: (PFnet) operate a community email network with 17 rural access points (Apr 2005) https://web.archive.org/web/20010415150953/http://www.peoplefirst.net.sb/General/PFnet.htm
PFnet is also establishing a VSAT network of distance learning centres in rural community schools under an EU-funded project http://www.peoplefirst.net.sb/dlcp 
It is hoped each host school will contribute to the Wikipedia or create their own wikis.

Country code (Top level domain): SB

References 

 
Solomon
Solomon